Branislav Gröhling (born 6 April 1974 in Partizánske) is a Slovak politician, who served as the Minister of Education, Science, Research and Sports between 2020 and 2022.

Early life
Gröhling trained as a shoemaker in his hometown of Partizánske, but never practiced the trade. Instead, he became a popular hairdresser and stylist, eventually becoming the owner of hairdressing chain in Bratislava called Pierot. While running his business, he faced a shortage of skilled labor, which motivated him to start promoting service trades education, in particular in the beauty and gastronomy industries.

Political career
Gröhling was elected MP of the National Council in the 2016 Slovak parlientary election on the Freedom and Solidarity party list. After the 2020 Slovak parliamentary election he became the Minister of Education. As a minister he had to cope with the impact of the COVID-19 pandemic, the influx of children refugees escaping the Russo-Ukrainian War and the efforts to implement curriculum reform and to reform the underperforming education system. He earned praise for being open to dialogue, but also criticism for a lack of specific results. In September 2022, he resigned along with other SaS ministers due to disagreement with politics of Igor Matovič.

Plagiarism allegations
In 2009, at the age of 35, Gröhling graduated in law at the Pan-European University. Nine years later the daily Denník N reported that Gröhling's final thesis was plagiarized and moreover when the plagiarism scandal of the Speaker of Slovak parliament broke out, Gröhling had his thesis removed from the Internet. Gröhling refused the calls to resign arguing that his thesis has to be evaluated on the basis on criteria, which were in effect at the Pan-European University at the time when the thesis was defended. He also refused to give up his academic title. In June 2021, Gröhling fired his Deputy Monika Filipová, who had previously criticized him for his conduct with connection of the plagiarized final theses. Filipová blamed the firing on retribution by Gröhling for the criticism.

References

Living people
1974 births
Slovak businesspeople
Education ministers of Slovakia
Members of the National Council (Slovakia) 2016-2020
People involved in plagiarism controversies
Members of the National Council (Slovakia) 2020-present
People from Partizánske
Slovak people of German descent